Clinuropsis is a genus of extinct sea snails, marine gastropod mollusks unassigned in the superfamily Conoidea.

Species
Species within the genus Clinuropsis include:

 Clinuropsis dictyota (Sysoev, 1997): synonym of Lusitanops dictyota Sysoev, 1997

References

Conoidea
Monotypic gastropod genera